Arrizabalaga is a Basque surname. Notable people with the surname include:

Gorka Arrizabalaga (born 1977), Spanish cyclist 
Kepa Arrizabalaga (born 1994), Spanish football player
Raul Fernández Arrizabalaga (born 1972), Spanish cyclist and judoka

Basque-language surnames